Club Atlético Candeleda is a football team based in Candeleda in the autonomous community of Castile and León. It was founded in 1977.

Season to season

2 seasons in Primera Regional

References

External links
Official website

Football clubs in Castile and León
Divisiones Regionales de Fútbol clubs
Association football clubs established in 1977
1977 establishments in Spain
Province of Ávila